Cyrtospirifer verneuili, also called Spirifer verneuili, is an extinct species of brachiopods. The fossils are present in the Upper Devonian.

In Cornwall they have the vernacular name Delabole butterfly, from the appearance of flattened forms in the slates at Delabole.

References

 Paleobiology Database

Prehistoric brachiopods
Spiriferida